Abbey Gateway may refer to:

 Abbey Gateway, Chester, the former gateway of St Werburgh's Abbey in Chester, England
 Abbey Gateway, Malvern, the former gateway of Malvern Priory in Malvern, England that is now the home of Malvern Museum
 Abbey Gateway, Reading, the former inner gateway of Reading Abbey in Reading, England
Abbey Gateway, St. Albans, the former gateway of the Benedictine Abbey in St. Albans, England